Walter Jenks  was an eminent Anglican priest in the first half of the 20th century.  He was born in Lambeth on  26 May 1864, educated at King's College London  and ordained in 1888. He held curacies at North Molton and Chipping Barnet, where he was curate in charge of St. Peter’s, Arkley. After this he was Assistant Missioner for the Diocese of St Albans and then Priest in charge of  St Margaret's, Aberlour. He was Rector of St Ninian's, Glen Urquhart from 1928  (and Dean of Moray, Ross and Caithness from 1932) until his death on 29 March 1935.

Notes

1864 births
People from Lambeth
Alumni of King's College London
English Anglicans
Deans of Moray, Ross and Caithness
1935 deaths